Puerphorus is a genus of moths in the family Pterophoridae containing only one species, Puerphorus olbiadactylus, which is known from Yemen, Afghanistan, Algeria, Iran, Israel, Jordan, Lebanon, Morocco, Syria, Tunisia, southern Europe and Turkey.

The larvae feed on Phagnalon rupestre, Phagnalon saxatile, Phagnalon sordidum and Phagnalon telonense.

References

Oidaematophorini
Moths of the Arabian Peninsula
Moths of Europe
Moths described in 1859
Monotypic moth genera
Taxa named by Pierre Millière